Ramón Alberto Castillo Hernández  (born 10 June 1985 in San Manuel, Cortés) is a Honduran footballer, who last played for CD Marathón.

Club career
Castillo played for Olimpia, Real España as well as for Salvadoran outfit Atlético Marte. In July 2011 he joined Platense.

He signed with Guatemalan side Juventud Retalteca in January 2012, but was released in April 2012 since the club could not afford to pay his wages.

References

External links
 
 Ramón Castillo esta arrepentido - Hondudiario 

1985 births
Living people
People from Cortés Department
Association football forwards
Honduran footballers
C.D. Olimpia players
Real C.D. España players
Honduran expatriate sportspeople in El Salvador
C.D. Atlético Marte footballers
Honduran expatriate sportspeople in Guatemala
Platense F.C. players
Expatriate footballers in Guatemala
Honduran expatriate footballers
Expatriate footballers in El Salvador